Lofotkraft is a power company that operates the power grid in Lofoten, Norway as well as ten hydroelectric power plants through the subsidiary Lofotkraft Produksjon. Since 1998 retailing of power has been managed by Kraftinor, a joint venture with Narvik Energi. It also owns half of Lofotkraft Vind, along with Narvik Energi.

The company is owned by the six municipalities it operates the power grid in, Vestvågøy (41%), Vågan (41%), Flakstad (6.5%), Moskenes (6.5%), Værøy (3%) and Røst (2%).

Electric power companies of Norway
Companies based in Nordland
Companies owned by municipalities of Norway
Year of establishment missing
Lofoten